Hellinsia mesoleucus is a moth of the family Pterophoridae. It is known from New Guinea.

References

External links
Papua Insects

mesoleucus
Insects of Papua New Guinea
Moths of New Guinea
Moths described in 1952